Short-tailed bat may refer to two groups of bats:
Carollia, from Central and South America;
Mystacina, from New Zealand.

Animal common name disambiguation pages